Tutusago Dam  is a trapezoidal dam located in Miyagi Prefecture in Japan. The dam is used for flood control, irrigation and power production. The catchment area of the dam is 42.4 km2. The dam impounds about 151  ha of land when full and can store 45700 thousand cubic meters of water. The construction of the dam was started on 2013.

See also
List of dams in Japan

References

Dams in Miyagi Prefecture